Rosie Campbell (born September 1976) is professor of politics at King's College, University of London. Previously she was a professor at UCL and Birkbeck College. She is a specialist in public expectations of politicians and voting behaviour.

In 2014 she published research with Sarah Childs which indicated that women conservatives were not as right wing as male conservatives on issues that related to economics.

Broadcasts

"How Voters Decide", Analysis, BBC Radio 4.

References 

British women academics
Academics of Birkbeck, University of London
English political scientists
1976 births
Living people
Women political scientists